Washington College is a private liberal arts college in Chestertown, Maryland, which is on the Eastern Shore of Maryland. The college was founded in 1782 by William Smith, but is the successor institution to the earlier Kent County Free School which was founded in 1732. Modern college classes – freshman, sophomore, junior, and senior – were introduced in the 1870s by President William Rivers. At the same time, a class called sub-freshmen was created for students that did not meet the requirements to be freshmen. The college continued to admit sub-freshmen to the preparatory department until 1924.

Washington College experienced major fires in 1827 and 1916 that destroyed most of the school's records. Because of this, it is impossible to know how many students graduated before 1916 and which years people graduated. However, it is known that 218 students graduated between 1845 and 1903 and, that in 1910, the college had 113 students enrolled. The college has continued to grow since then. In 1952, the college more than doubled its enrollment to 350 students. Between the 1950s and 1970s, the college doubled its enrollment again to 800 students in 1972. Since the 1970s, the college has close to doubled the 1972 enrollment with 1,480 students enrolled in 2019.

Alumni of Washington College includes two Governors of Maryland, a Governor of Delaware, four United States Senators, seven members of the United States House of Representatives, and nine State senators. Outside of the world of politics, nine alumni of Washington College played at least one game in Major League Baseball including Jake Flowers who was on two World Series winning teams. John Emory, the namesake of Emory University and Emory & Henry College, graduated from Washington College. Several alumni were successful writers including James M. Cain and Đỗ Nguyên Mai. Mary Adele France, who was the first president of St. Mary's College of Maryland, and Robert K. Crane, who discovered sodium-glucose cotransport, both found success in academia. H. Lawrence Culp Jr. has found success in business as the CEO of Danaher Corporation and the CEO of General Electric.

 A "?" indicates that the year of graduation is unknown.
 "A "" indicates the final year that a non-graduating alumnus attended the college.
 An "M" indicates a Master's alumnus.

Arts and entertainment

Athletics

Law and government

Other

References

Notes

Citations

Bibliography

External links

Washington College alumni